Barbara Dosher is an American scientist and academic specializing in neurology of human memory and attention processes. She is the former dean of the School of Social Sciences and a Distinguished Professor of Cognitive Sciences at University of California, Irvine. She is also the director of the Memory Attention Perception Lab at UC Irvine. Dosher is a member of the National Academy of Sciences. Dosher received the 2018 Atkinson Prize in Psychological and Cognitive Sciences.

Education and research 

Barbara Dosher received a B.A. in psychology with a minor in biochemistry from the University of California, San Diego in 1973. She completed her research doctoral training at the University of Oregon in Experimental psychology in 1977. Currently, her primary research interests involve aspects of attentional processes and human memory, particularly forgetting and retrieval of implicit and explicit working memories. She also studies the neural mechanisms of perceptual task learning. Barbara is the co-author of two academic books on vision science: Perceptual Learning: How Experience Shapes Visual Perception and Visual Psychophysics: From Laboratory to Theory.

Awards and honors 

 2018, Atkinson Prize in Psychological and Cognitive Sciences

References 

Living people
Year of birth missing (living people)
Place of birth missing (living people)
Members of the United States National Academy of Sciences
American women scientists
American women psychologists
21st-century American psychologists
21st-century American women